Mwangangi is a surname of Kenyan origin that may refer to:

Caleb Mwangangi Ndiku (born 1992), Kenyan middle-distance runner and 2012 African champion
Jimmy Mwangangi Muindi (born 1973), Kenyan marathon runner and six-time winner of the Honolulu Marathon
John Nzau Mwangangi (born 1990), Kenyan long-distance runner and 2011 African cross country champion

See also
Mwangi, a similar Kenyan name

Kenyan names